John Smith (7 February 1915 – 21 April 1975) was an English footballer and football manager. A forward, he scored 119 goals in 216 league games during nine seasons of peacetime football in the Football League.

He began his professional career at Huddersfield Town in 1932, helping the club to a second-place finish in the First Division in 1933–34, before he was signed by Newcastle United three years later. After scoring 73 goals in 112 Second Division games, he was sold on to Manchester United for £6,500 in February 1938. He helped the Red Devils to win promotion in 1937–38, but then the outbreak of war in Europe robbed him of seven full seasons of First Division football. After the war he played for Blackburn Rovers. In May 1947, he transferred to Port Vale, before moving on to non-league Congleton Town in 1948 and Macclesfield Town in 1949, whom he managed from 1951 to 1955.

Career 
After spells with Whitehall Printers and Dewsbury Moor Welfare, Smith started his professional career with Huddersfield Town in 1932. He made his debut under Clem Stephenson in the 1932–33 campaign, and scored his first First Division goal on 7 January, in a 1–0 win over Chelsea at Stamford Bridge. He then scored in a 4–0 win over Newcastle United at Leeds Road on 11 February, and seven days later bagged two goals against Aston Villa in a 3–0 win at Villa Park. He added to his tally with strikes against Sunderland, Sheffield Wednesday, Manchester City, and two against Arsenal, to finish his debut season with nine goals in 15 appearances.

He scored 15 goals in 24 league games in 1933–34, as the Terriers finished as runners-up, three points behind Arsenal. After just six goalless appearances in the 1934–35 campaign, he left Yorkshire to join Newcastle United, who had just recently lost their top-flight status. He was one of manager Tom Mather's first signings. Smith scored 16 goals to finish as the club's top scorer, though they finished ten points short of Bolton Wanderers in the promotion places. Smith continued to be the Magpies' main target man in 1935–36, scoring 26 goals, though Newcastle again finished with 46 points, this time nine points behind second placed Charlton Athletic. The 1936–37 season was his final full season at St James' Park, and Smith scored 24 goals; this time Newcastle finished fourth, six points behind promoted Blackpool.

Newcastle faced a relegation battle in 1937–38, and Smith was transferred to Walter Crickmer's Manchester United for a club record £6,500 in February 1938. He scored on his debut in a win over Barnsley at Oakwell on 2 February, and totalled eight goals in 1937–38, as United finished in second place and were thus promoted back into the top-flight. The Red Devils then consolidated their First Division status with a 14th-place finish in 1938–39, Smith scoring six goals. The outbreak of World War II then meant that the Football League was suspended for seven whole seasons. Smith was prolific in the War League Western Division in 1939–40, scoring 16 goals in United's 22 matches. He stayed at Old Trafford in 1940–41, bagging 26 goals in the War League North Regional League, including five against Blackburn Rovers on 28 December. In 1941–42 he hit 18 goals, as United finished fourth in the first edition of the War League North Regional League, before winning the second instalment of the competition.

Smith hit 36 goals in 1942–43, hitting hat-tricks against Blackburn Rovers, Manchester City, Wrexham (home and away), Everton, and Crewe Alexandra. He stayed on for the 1943–44 season, and hit 35 goals, bagging hat-tricks against Stockport County, Oldham Athletic, and Burnley; United finished second behind Blackpool in the first instalment of the regional league. He scored nine goals in 1944–45, and hit a hat-trick past Burnley in front of newly appointed manager Matt Busby. Smith struck 17 times in 1945–46, including once against Accrington Stanley at Peel Park in first edition of the FA Cup since the outbreak of war. He did not, however, score a goal during the 1946–47 campaign, as Busby led his team to a second-place finish in the First Division, one point behind Liverpool.

Officially, Smith is recognised as having scored 15 league and cup goals for United during his career, but he also scored over 150 goals during the war. These goals are not counted towards the official total as they are classified as friendlies. During the war he also guested for Burnley and Blackburn Rovers. He left Manchester United after 15 goals in 41 league and cup games, and joined Eddie Hapgood's Blackburn Rovers for a £3,000 fee in March 1946. He was signed by Gordon Hodgson's Port Vale for a four-figure fee in May 1947. He scored on the penultimate day of the 1946–47 season, in a 4–2 win over Crystal Palace at The Old Recreation Ground. Smith enjoyed regular football until he pulled a stomach muscle in November 1947, which kept him out of action for four months. He recovered by March 1947 and regained him first team spot, but refused new terms at the end of the 1947–48 season and was transferred to Cheshire County League side Congleton Town, having scored 10 goals for the Valiants in 29 appearances in the Third Division South.

He moved on to Macclesfield Town and scored 33 goals in the 1950–51 season to become the club's top-scorer, lifting the Cheshire Senior Cup at the end of the campaign. He was appointed as manager in October 1951, and guided the Silkmen to the Cheshire County League title in 1952–53.

Career statistics
Source:

Honours 
Manchester United
 War League North Regional League Second Championship: 1941–42

Macclesfield Town
 Cheshire Senior Cup: 1951
 Cheshire County League: 1952–53

References 

1915 births
1975 deaths
Sportspeople from Batley
Footballers from Yorkshire
English footballers
Association football forwards
Huddersfield Town A.F.C. players
Newcastle United F.C. players
Manchester United F.C. players
Liverpool F.C. wartime guest players
Burnley F.C. wartime guest players
Blackburn Rovers F.C. wartime guest players
Blackburn Rovers F.C. players
Port Vale F.C. players
Congleton Town F.C. players
Macclesfield Town F.C. players
English Football League players
English football managers
Macclesfield Town F.C. managers